Shenatagh is a village in the Sisian Municipality of the Syunik Province in Armenia.

Etymology 
The village was previously known as Shinagat and Lernashen.

Demographics 
The Statistical Committee of Armenia reported its population was 422 in 2010, up from 390 at the 2001 census.

References 

Populated places in Syunik Province